Juan de los Ángeles (1536–1609) was a Spanish priest and writer.

Works
Triunfos del amor de Dios, Medina del Campo 1590
Sermón en las honras de la católica cesárea Magestad de la Emperatriz nuestra reina, del 17-III-1603, Madrid 1603.
Salterio espiritual (1604)
Presencia de Dios (1604).
Tratado espiritual de los soberanos misterios de la misa, Madrid 1604.
Consideraciones sobre los Cantares (1606)
Tratado espiritual de cómo el alma ha de traer siempre a Dios delante de sí, Madrid 1607.
Vergel espiritual del ánima religiosa..., Madrid 1610.
Manual de vida perfecta (1608)

16th-century Spanish writers
16th-century male writers
17th-century Spanish writers
1609 deaths
1536 births
Spanish Roman Catholic priests
17th-century male writers